The Newman–Kwart rearrangement is a type of rearrangement reaction in which the aryl group of an O-aryl thiocarbamate, ArOC(=S)NMe2, migrates from the oxygen atom to the sulfur atom, forming an S-aryl thiocarbamate, ArSC(=O)NMe2. The reaction is named after its discoverers, Melvin Spencer Newman and Harold Kwart. The reaction is a manifestation of the double bond rule.

Mechanism
The Newman–Kwart rearrangement is intramolecular; it proceeds via a four-membered cyclic transition state.

Use for preparation of thiophenols
The Newman–Kwart rearrangement is an important prelude to the synthesis of thiophenols. A phenol (1) is deprotonated with a base followed by treatment with a thiocarbamoyl chloride (2) to form an O-aryl thiocarbamate (3). Heating 3 to around 250 °C causes it undergo Newman–Kwart rearrangement to an S-aryl thiocarbamate (4). Alkaline hydrolysis or similar cleavage yields a thiophenol (5).

See also
 Smiles rearrangement
 Chapman rearrangement

References

Rearrangement reactions
Name reactions